The 10th Genie Awards were held on March 22, 1989. This was in the middle of a strike at the CBC, causing the ceremony to be scaled down and several nominees to boycott the awards in sympathy; although the ceremony was still aired by CBC Television, the Academy of Canadian Cinema and Television was forced to produce the broadcast alone.

The awards were dominated by David Cronenberg's Dead Ringers, which won ten awards. The event was held at the Westin Harbour Castle Hotel in Toronto and was hosted by Dave Thomas.

Nominees and winners
Nominees and winners were:

References

10
Genie
Genie